The 2012 Tour de Picardie was the 66th edition of the Tour de Picardie cycling stage race. It started on 11 May in Clermont and ended on 13 May in Maignelay-Montigny and consisted of three stages.

The race was won by Argos-Shimano rider John Degenkolb, who claimed the leader's yellow jersey after winning the first and the third stage. His winning margin over runner-up Kenny van Hummel of Vacansoleil-DCM was 10 seconds, and Cofidis' Leonardo Duque completed the podium, 15 seconds down on Degenkolb.

In the race's other classifications, Argos-Shimano rider John Degenkolb won the points classification's green jersey. Cofidis rider Leonardo Duque King of the Mountains classification, with Team Europcar finishing at the head of the teams classification.

Stages

1
11 May 2012 – Clermont to Braine, 166.5 km
Stage Result and General Classification after Stage

2
12 May 2012 – Tergnier to Villers-Bocage, 178.5 km
Stage Result and General Classification after Stage

3
13 May 2012 – Fressenneville to Maignelay-Montigny, 171 km
Stage Result and General Classification after Stage

Classification leadership

Winners

General classification

Points

Mountains

Team

References
 https://web.archive.org/web/20120516153029/http://www.letour.fr/2012/TDO/LIVE/fr/100/classement/index.html

See also
 https://web.archive.org/web/20110623140759/http://www.letour.fr/fr/homepage_courseTDO.html

Tour de Picardie
Tour de Picardie
2012